George Ritchie Maxwell (January 11, 1857 – November 17, 1902) was a Canadian Presbyterian minister and politician.

Born in Stonehouse, South Lanarkshire, Scotland, he was ordained a minister of the Church of Scotland in 1880. He migrated to Canada in 1885 serving as a minister in Quebec eventually setting in Vancouver, British Columbia in 1890.

In 1894, he founded the Nationalist Party, BC's first labour party. He ran as a candidate under that label for the British Columbia riding of Burrard in 1896. He was sometimes identified as a Liberal due to his opposition to the Conservative party. He was elected.

Running as a Liberal, he was re-elected in 1900.

He died in office in 1902 from intestinal cancer at the age of 45.

References

External links
 

1857 births
1902 deaths
Liberal Party of Canada MPs
Members of the House of Commons of Canada from British Columbia
19th-century Ministers of the Church of Scotland
People from Stonehouse, South Lanarkshire
Scottish emigrants to Canada
Canadian Presbyterian ministers